The Haiti national badminton team represents Haiti in international badminton team competitions. It is administered by Federation Haitienne de Badminton, the governing body for badminton in Haiti. The Haitian national team is ranked 115 on the BWF World Team Ranking.

The Haitian junior team competed in the 2017 Pan Am Junior Badminton Championships mixed team event. The team finished in 10th place in the tournament.

Participation in Pan American Badminton Championships 
Mixed team U19

Current squad 
The following players were selected to represent Haiti at the 2017 Pan Am Junior Badminton Championships.

Men
Walter Jean-Pierre
Wood-Lenz Ricardy Pierre Paul

Women
Alanda Baptiste
Durlie Pierre Louis

References 

Badminton
National badminton teams